AMSOIL Arena is a multipurpose arena in Duluth, Minnesota, home to the UMD Men's and UMD Women's hockey teams. It opened in 2010, replacing the Duluth Entertainment Convention Center Arena on the waterfront near Duluth's landmark Aerial Lift Bridge.

Naming rights for 20 years were purchased by AMSOIL, a corporation based in Superior, Wisconsin, for $6 million, one-third up front.

The facility cost nearly $80 million; about half ($38 million) paid by the State of Minnesota through a 2008 bond bill, another 27% (about $21.6 million) by a voter-approved city food-and-beverage tax increase, 12% (about $9.6 million) by UMD, and the last 11% (about $8.8 million) by the DECC. Construction ran from September 2008 to December 2010, and included a 475-space parking garage with a skywalk connecting it to the arena.

The first event held at the arena was on December 30, 2010. UMD men's hockey team lost 0–5 to North Dakota before a crowd of 6,764, tied for the team's highest home attendance that season.

In their first season in the arena, the UMD men's hockey team won the NCAA Men's Ice Hockey Championship. In 2012, the arena hosted the 2012 NCAA Division I Women's Ice Hockey Tournament, in which Minnesota beat Wisconsin, 4–2.

The arena's attendance record was set on June 20, 2018, during a President Donald Trump rally, which drew 8,372 people. The attendance record for a sporting event was set on January 25, 2020, when UMD men's hockey team lost to their rival, North Dakota, 2–3 in front of 7,711 fans.

Comparison to DECC Arena

Arena Usage

Hockey
AMSOIL Arena is primarily used as a hockey arena home to the University of Minnesota-Duluth's men's and women's hockey teams. The arena hosted the 2012 NCAA Division I Women's Ice Hockey Tournament and the 2023 NCAA Division I Women's Ice Hockey Tournament.

AMSOIL Arena hosted the 2017 Ice Breaker Tournament, held October 6-7th 2017.  Four teams participated in the tournament.  Michigan Tech defeated Union College 6-3 and University of Minnesota Duluth defeated University of Minnesota 4–3 in overtime in the tournament's first round.  In the final round, University of Minnesota Duluth fell to tournament champion Michigan Tech 4–3, while in the consolation game the University of Minnesota beat Union College 2–0.

Other hockey events include preseason practices for the National Hockey League's Minnesota Wild-open to the public, Minnesota State High School League section 7A and 7AA tournament games, as well as a high-school all-star game.

Basketball
AMSOIL Arena hosted the Harlem Globetrotters in 2012, 2014, 2016, 2017, 2018, and 2019, for which Minnesota Lynx's (WNBA) court has been brought up from Minneapolis, Minnesota.

Events
AMSOIL Arena has held many different types of events, from comedians Jeff Dunham and Jim Gaffigan to Cirque du Soleil. The local AAD Shrine holds its annual AAD Shrine Circus fundraiser at the arena each April. The arena also hosts concerts. The Duluth Superior Symphony Orchestra had the first non-sporting event held at the arena, "Cirque de la Symphonie on Ice", on December 31, 2010, a day after the facility opened. It can also be converted to host dinners and conventions. On June 20, 2018, President Donald Trump held a rally in the arena that saw a record breaking attendance of 8,372.

The following is not a complete list of concerts.

Awards
In 2013, Stadium Journey rated AMSOIL Arena as the best stadium experience in the United States and Canada. In 2014 and 2015, Stadium Journey rated AMSOIL Arena as the second best stadium experience in the United States and Canada, behind Oriole Park at Camden Yards home to Major League Baseball's Baltimore Orioles.

AMSOIL Arena was ranked the best college hockey arena by Stadium Journey in 2014 and 2015.

The Wall Street Journal named AMSOIL Arena one of its 10 "Golden Zamboni" winners for its uniqueness among the nation's college hockey venues.

References

College ice hockey venues in the United States
Sports venues in Minnesota
Convention centers in Minnesota
Buildings and structures in Duluth, Minnesota
Tourist attractions in Duluth, Minnesota
Indoor ice hockey venues in Minnesota
2010 establishments in Minnesota
Sports venues completed in 2010
Sports venues in the Duluth–Superior metropolitan area